This is an alphabetical list of cricketers who have played for North West Thunder since their founding in 2020. They first played in the Rachael Heyhoe Flint Trophy, a 50 over competition that began in 2020. In 2021, the Twenty20 Charlotte Edwards Cup was added to the women's domestic structure in England.

Players' names are followed by the years in which they were active as a North West Thunder player. Seasons given are first and last seasons; the player did not necessarily play in all the intervening seasons. Current players are shown as active to the latest season in which they played for the club. This list only includes players who appeared in at least one match for North West Thunder; players who were named in the team's squad for a season but did not play a match are not included.

B
 Georgie Boyce (2020–2022)
 Natalie Brown (2020–2022)

C
 Alice Clarke (2020)
 Piepa Cleary (2021)
 Danielle Collins (2020–2022)
 Kate Cross (2020–2022)

D
 Deandra Dottin (2022)
 Rebecca Duckworth (2020–2022)
 Alice Dyson (2020–2021)

E
 Sophie Ecclestone (2020–2022)

G
 Phoebe Graham (2022)

H
 Alex Hartley (2020–2022)
 Liberty Heap (2020–2022)

J
 Laura Jackson (2020–2022)
 Hannah Jones (2020–2022)

L
 Emma Lamb (2020–2022)

M
 Laura Marshall (2020–2022)
 Daisy Mullan (2021–2022)

P
 Shachi Pai (2022)

S
 Seren Smale (2021–2022)

T
 Olivia Thomas (2020)
 Eleanor Threlkeld (2020–2022)
 Sophia Turner (2020–2022)

Captains

See also
 List of Lancashire Thunder cricketers

References

North West Thunder